Saline is an unincorporated community in Menard County, Texas, United States. According to the Handbook of Texas, the community had an estimated population of 59 in 2000.

References

Unincorporated communities in Menard County, Texas
Unincorporated communities in Texas